In enzymology, a taurine dehydrogenase is an enzyme that catalyzes the chemical reaction.

taurine + H2O + acceptor  sulfoacetaldehyde + NH3 + reduced acceptor

The 3 substrates of this enzyme are taurine, H2O, and acceptor, whereas its 3 products are sulfoacetaldehyde, NH3, and reduced acceptor.

This enzyme belongs to the family of oxidoreductases, specifically those acting on the CH-NH2 group of donors with other acceptors. The systematic name of this enzyme class is taurine:acceptor oxidoreductase (deaminating). This enzyme is also called taurine:(acceptor) oxidoreductase (deaminating). This enzyme participates in nitrogen metabolism.

References

 

EC 1.4.99
Enzymes of unknown structure